Delia Zapata Olivella (Santa Cruz of Lorica, Córdoba, 1 April 1926 – Bogota, 24 May 2001) was a Colombian dancer, choreographer, and folklorist.

Zapata Olivella was the sister of the late Colombian author Manuel Zapata Olivella.

Zapata Olivella died on 24 May 2001 of complications from malaria after a tour in Africa

Bibliography 
 "La Cumbia: Síntesis Musical de la Nación Colombiana, Reseña Histórica y Coreográfica". 1962. Revista Colombiana de Folclor III(7): 189–200.

References 

1926 births
2001 deaths
Colombian female dancers
Colombian choreographers
Colombian folklorists
Women historians
Women folklorists